Brigade III of the Polish Legions was a unit of the Austro-Hungarian Army, manned by Austrian Poles. It was formed in 1915, existed till 1917, and was a part of the Polish Legions in World War I.

History
The Third Brigade was formed on 8 May 1915, as part of the Polish Legions in World War I. 

The Brigade commanders included: Zygmunt Zieliński (April 1915 - September 1915), Wiktor Grzesicki (September 1915 - July 1916), Stanisław Szeptycki (July 1916 - October 1916), and Bolesław Roja (?).

In 1917 the III Brigade together with the I Brigade followed Józef Piłsudski during the Oath crisis, refusing to swear the oath, and was disbanded.

Battles
Major battles fought by the Third Brigade included:
 battle of Jastków (31 July to 3 August 1915)
 Battle of Kostiuchnówka (4 to 6 July 1916)

Organization
The Third Brigade comprised 2 infantry regiments (the 4th, 5th and the 6th periodically served in it), a cavalry regiment (the 3rd), artillery battalions, and support units.

References

Military units and formations established in 1915
Military units and formations disestablished in 1917
Polish Legions infantry brigades of Austria-Hungary
1915 establishments in Austria-Hungary
1915 establishments in Poland